Kjell Roar Kaasa (born 15 March 1966) is a Norwegian retired professional footballer who played as a striker

Kaasa's clubs include Drangedal, Kjosen, Bøler, Skeid, Kongsvinger, Lyn, Rosenborg, Stabæk, Vålerenga, Follo and Manglerud Star.

Career statistics

Honours
 Tippeligaen top scorer: |1992 (17 goals)

References

1966 births
Living people
People from Drangedal
Norwegian footballers
Association football forwards
Lyn Fotball players
Follo FK players
Kongsvinger IL Toppfotball players
Manglerud Star Toppfotball players
Rosenborg BK players
Skeid Fotball players
Stabæk Fotball players
Vålerenga Fotball players
Eliteserien players
Norwegian First Division players
Norwegian association football commentators
Sportspeople from Vestfold og Telemark